Monessen High School is a high school located in Monessen, Pennsylvania. It is part of the Monessen City School District and is the only high school within the city of Monessen.

The school colors are black and white. The official high school mascot is the Greyhound, and their yearbook is similarly named The Greyhound.

In 2013 the Pennsylvania Department of Education published a list of schools that achieved the lowest 15 percentile of standardized test scores for the 2011-2012 school year, including Monessen High School.

Notable alumni
 Christian B. Anfinsen, chemist who won the Nobel Prize in 1972
 Julius Dawkins, NFL football player
 Albert Lexie, shoeshiner who gave away a third of his lifetime income to charity
 Frances McDormand, actress, known for her performance as Marge Gunderson in Fargo
 Michael Moorer, boxer

References

External links

Public high schools in Pennsylvania
Schools in Westmoreland County, Pennsylvania